The athletics competition at the 1981 Southeast Asian Games was held from 10 December to 15 December at the Rizal Memorial Stadium, Manila, Philippines.

Medal summary

Men

Women

Medal table

References
 https://eresources.nlb.gov.sg/newspapers/Digitised/Article/straitstimes19811211-1.2.125.3
 https://eresources.nlb.gov.sg/newspapers/Digitised/Article/straitstimes19811212-1.2.148.2
 https://eresources.nlb.gov.sg/newspapers/Digitised/Article/straitstimes19811213-1.2.91
 https://eresources.nlb.gov.sg/newspapers/Digitised/Article/straitstimes19811214-1.2.122.5

1981 Southeast Asian Games events
1981
1981 in athletics (track and field)